The Viggarbach (also: Mühlbach or Mühltaler Bach) is a river of Tyrol, Austria.

The Viggarbach's origin is the lake . It flows through the valley with the same name in western direction and merges near Schönberg with the Sill.

The rapid small creek keeps its Grade A water quality in the whole course, but gets dangerous at high water or strong rain. Thanks to the fact that nearby townships are further away from the creek, there is less danger for settlements.

References

Rivers of Tyrol (state)
Tux Alps
Rivers of Austria